The entourage effect is a hypothesis that cannabis compounds other than tetrahydrocannabinol (THC) act synergistically with it to modulate the overall psychoactive effects of the plant.

Compounds

Cannabinoids

CBD
However, CBD oil can be delivered via other routes of administration if this effect is not desired. For example, CBD is under preliminary research for its potential to modify the effects of THC, possibly mitigating some of the negative, psychosis-like effects of THC.

Cannabis strains with relatively high CBD:THC ratios have been proposed to be less likely to induce anxiety than vice versa, though this assertion has been challenged on account of contradictory findings in the literature. As an example, a 2022 cross-over study based on 47 participants exposed to pure THC as well as 1:1, 2:1, and 3:1 ratios of CBD:THC concluded that CBD did not mitigate any of the studied effects of THC at any ratio tested.

This may be due to CBD's antagonistic effects at the cannabinoid receptors, compared to THC's partial agonist effect. CBD is also a 5-HT1A receptor (serotonin) agonist, which may also contribute to an anxiolytic-content effect.

Terpenes
There are numerous terpenes present in the cannabis plant and variation between strains. Some of the different terpenes have known pharmacological effects and have been studied.

One hypothesis is that myrcene is a prominent sedative terpenoid in cannabis, and combined with THC, may produce the "couch-lock" phenomenon.

Hypothetical differences between C. indica and C. sativa
The effects of sativa are well known for its cerebral high, while indica is well known for its sedative effects, which some prefer for nighttime use. Both types are used as medical cannabis.

 Cannabinoid ratios: On average, Cannabis indica has higher levels of THC compared to CBD, whereas Cannabis sativa has lower levels of THC to CBD. However, huge variability exists within either species. A 2015 study shows the average THC content of the most popular herbal cannabis products in the Netherlands has decreased slightly since 2005.
 Terpene ratios: Sativa ancestry is associated with farnesene and bergamotene, while Indica ancestry is associated with myrcene, elemene, and sesquiterpene alcohols.

Criticism
In 2022, studies found that plants identified as "indica" or "sativa" based on common methods of differentiation (e.g. plant height or leaf shape) are not, in fact, chemically distinguishable, with many identified as "sativa" having cannabinoid ratios predicted of "indica" plants and vice versa. The authors have concluded that the chemical makeup of cannabis plants cannot be reliably determined by simple inspection of the plants' physical characteristics and that the "indica" and "sativa" labels are not informative as to the cannabinoids (or other chemical components) delivered.

Background 
The phrase entourage effect was introduced in 1999. While originally identified as a novel method of endocannabinoid regulation by which multiple endogenous chemical species display a cooperative effect in eliciting a cellular response, the term has evolved to describe the polypharmacy effects of combined cannabis phytochemicals or whole plant extracts. The phrase now commonly refers to the compounds present in cannabis supposedly working in concert to create "the sum of all the parts that leads to the magic or power of cannabis". Other cannabinoids, terpenoids, and flavonoids may be part of an entourage effect.

Criticism
A 2020 review of research found no entourage effect in most studies, while other reports claimed mixed results, including the possibility of increased adverse effects. The review concluded that the term, "entourage effect", is  unfounded and used mainly for marketing. The author also notes that there is no reason to expect that entourage synergism should result in a net benefit. That is to say, one might just as well expect cannabinoid/cannabinoid or cannabinoid/terpene interactions to amplify/augment the adverse effects or mitigate/diminish any beneficial effects of both cannabinoids and terpenes.

References 

Cannabinoids
Cannabis and health
Hypotheses